Daniela de Oliveira Piedade (born 2 March 1979) is a Brazilian handball player. She plays for Spanish team handball HC Puig d'en Valls and for the Brazilian national team. She participated at the 2004 Summer Olympics in Athens, at the 2008 Summer Olympics in Beijing and at the 2012 Summer Olympics in London.

Achievements
Women Handball Austria:
Winner: 2004, 2005, 2006, 2007, 2008, 2009, 2010, 2011, 2012
ÖHB Cup:
Winner: 2004, 2005, 2006, 2007, 2008, 2009, 2010, 2011, 2012
EHF Champions League:
Finalist: 2008
Semifinalist: 2005, 2007, 2009, 2013
EHF Cup Winners' Cup
Runners-Up: 2004
EHF Champions Trophy
Runners-Up: 2008
 Pan American Championship:
Winner: 2007, 2011, 2013, 2015
 Runners-Up: 2009
 Slovenian League:
Winner: 2013, 2014
 Slovenian Cup:
Winner: 2013, 2014
 World Championship:
Winner: 2013

References

External links

1979 births
Living people
Handball players from São Paulo
Brazilian female handball players
Handball players at the 2003 Pan American Games
Handball players at the 2004 Summer Olympics
Handball players at the 2007 Pan American Games
Handball players at the 2008 Summer Olympics
Handball players at the 2011 Pan American Games
Handball players at the 2012 Summer Olympics
Handball players at the 2015 Pan American Games
Handball players at the 2016 Summer Olympics
Olympic handball players of Brazil
Expatriate handball players
Brazilian expatriate sportspeople in Austria
Brazilian expatriate sportspeople in Hungary
Brazilian expatriates in Slovenia
Siófok KC players
Pan American Games medalists in handball
Pan American Games gold medalists for Brazil
Fehérvár KC players
Medalists at the 2007 Pan American Games
Medalists at the 2015 Pan American Games
Medalists at the 2011 Pan American Games